The list of marine cnidarians of South Africa is a list of saltwater species that form a part of the cnidarian (Phylum Cnidaria) fauna of South Africa. This list does not include the freshwater cnidarians. The list follows the SANBI listing on iNaturalist, and does not always agree with WoRMS for distribution.

Class Anthozoa, subclass Hexacorallia

Order Actiniaria, suborder Endocoelantheae

Family Halcuriidae

Halcurias capensis Carlgren, 1928

Suborder Nynantheae, infraorder Athenaria

Family Edwardsiidae

Edwardsia capensis Carlgren, 1938

Family Halcampidae

Halcampa capensis Carlgren, 1938						
Halcampaster teres Carlgren, 1938						
Halianthella annularis Carlgren, 1938 – Brooding anemone

Family Haloclavidae

Haloclava capensis (Verrill, 1865)

Infraorder Thenaria

Superfamily Acontiaria, family Acontiophoridae

Acontiophorum mortenseni Carlgren, 1938

Family Aiptasiidae

Aiptasia parva Carlgren, 1938 – Trumpet anemone

Family Hormathiidae

Actinauge granulata Carlgren, 1928
Amphianthus capensis Carlgren, 1928
Amphianthus laevis Carlgren, 1938
Amphianthus natalensis Carlgren, 1938
Calliactis algoaensis Carlgren, 1938
Calliactis polypus (Forsskål, 1775) Symbiotic anemone
Phelliactis algoaensis Carlgren, 1928
Phelliactis capensis Carlgren, 1938

Family Isophellidae

Isophellia algoaensisCarlgren, 1928
Litophellia octoradiataCarlgren, 1938
Telmatactis natalensis Carlgren, 1938

Family Nemanthidae

Nemanthus nitidus(Wassilieff, 1908)

Family Sagartiidae

Anthothoe chilensis (Lesson, 1830) – Striped anemone
Anthothoe sp. – Square-mouth striped anemone
Phellia aucklandica (Carlgren, 1924)
Sagartia ornata (Holdsworth, 1855) – Rooted anemone

Superfamily Endomyaria, family Actiniidae
Actinia mandelae – Plum anemone
Anemonia natalensis Carlgren, 1938 – Natal anemone
Anthopleura anneae Carlgren, 1940 						
Anthopleura insignis Carlgren, 1940						
Anthopleura michaelseni (Pax, 1920) – Crevice anemone
Anthostella stephensoni Carlgren, 1938 – Violet spotted anemone
Anthostella sp. – Dwarf spotted anemone
Bolocera kerguelensis Studer, 1879
Bunodactis reynaudi (Milne Edwards, 1857) – Sandy anemone
Bunodosoma capense (Lesson, 1830) – Knobbly anemone
Entacmaea quadricolor (Leuckart in Rüppell & Leuckart, 1828) – Bubble-tip anemone
Gyractis sesere (Haddon & Shackleton, 1893) – Colonial anemone
Korsaranthus natalensis (Carlgren, 1938) – Candy-striped anemone
Pseudactinia flagellifera(Hertwig, 1882) – False plum anemone
Pseudactinia varia Carlgren, 1938
Urticinopsis crassa Carlgren, 1938

Family Actinodendronidae
Actinodendron hansingorum Carlgren, 1900

Family Aliciidae
Alicia sansibarensis Carlgren, 1900

Family Condylanthidae
Condylanthus magellanicus Carlgren, 1899

Family Liponematidae
Liponema multiporum (Hertwig, 1882)

Family Stichodactylidae
Heteractis aurora (Quoy & Gaimard, 1833)
Heteractis magnifica (Quoy & Gaimard, 1833) – Giant anemone
Stichodactyla mertensii Brandt, 1835

Superfamily Mesomyaria, family Actinostolidae
Anthosactis capensis Carlgren, 1938
Actinostola capensis (Carlgren, 1928)
Isanthus capensis Carlgren, 1938 – Ring tentacle anemone

Suborder Ptychodacteae

Family Preactiidae
Preactis millardae England in England & Robson, 1984 – Walking anemone, hedgehog anemone, sock anemone

Superfamily Actiniaria incertae sedis, family Metridiidae
Metridium senile (Linnaeus, 1761) – Feather-duster anemone
Metridium senile subsp. dianthus – (Not on WORMS)			
Metridium senile subsp. pallidus (Rawlinson, 1934)						
Metridium senile subsp. senile – (Not on WORMS)

Order Antipatharia

Family Antipathidae
Antipathes sp. – Branched black coral
Cirrhipathes sp. – Whip corals, Wire corals

Order Ceriantharia, suborder Spirularia

Family Cerianthidae
Ceriantheopsis austroafricanus Molodtsova, Griffiths & Acuña, 2011 – Tube anemone
Ceriantheopsis nikitai Molodtsova, 2001 – White tube anemone

Order Corallimorpharia

Family Corallimorphidae
Corynactis annulata (Verrill, 1867) – Strawberry anemone

Family Discosomatidae
Discosoma spp. – Elephant ear corals

Order Scleractinia

Family Acroporidae
Acropora abrotanoides (Lamarck, 1816)
Acropora aculeus (Dana, 1846)
Acropora anthocercis (Brook, 1893)
Acropora appressa (Ehrenberg, 1834) – nomen dubium
Acropora arabensis Hodgson & Carpenter, 1995
Acropora austera (Dana, 1846)
Acropora branchi Riegl, 1995
Acropora clathrata (Brook, 1891) – Staghorn coral
Acropora donei	Veron & Wallace, 1984
Acropora florida (Dana, 1846)
Acropora horrida (Dana, 1846)
Acropora humilis (Dana, 1846)
Acropora hyacinthus (Dana, 1846)
Acropora latistella (Brook, 1892)
Acropora millepora (Ehrenberg, 1834)
Acropora nana (Studer, 1877)
Acropora nasuta (Dana, 1846)
Acropora natalensis Riegl, 1995
Acropora sordiensis Riegl, 1995
Acropora stoddarti Pillai & Scheer, 1976 – (unaccepted on WoRMS)
Acropora tenuis (Dana, 1846)
Acropora valida (Dana, 1846)
Acropora verweyi Veron & Wallace, 1984
Acropora spp. Staghorn corals
Alveopora allingi Hoffmeister, 1925
Alveopora spongiosa Dana, 1846
Alveopora spp.
Astreopora incrustans Bernard, 1896
Astreopora listeri Bernard, 1896
Astreopora myriophthalma (Lamarck, 1816) – Many eyed star coral
Isopora palifera (Lamarck, 1816)
Montipora aequituberculata Bernard, 1897 – pore coral
Montipora danae Milne Edwards & Haime, 1851 – pore coral
Montipora monasteriata (Forskål, 1775) – pore coral
Montipora spongodes Bernard, 1897 – pore coral
Montipora tuberculosa (Lamarck, 1816) – pore coral
Montipora turgescens Bernard, 1897 – pore coral
Montipora venosa (Ehrenberg, 1834) – pore coral
Montipora verrucosa (Lamarck, 1816) – pore coral
Montipora spp. Warty coral

Family Agariciidae
Coeloseris mayeri Vaughan, 1918
Gardineroseris planulata (Dana, 1846)
Leptoseris explanata Yabe & Sugiyama, 1941 – Porcelain coral
Leptoseris spp. – Plate coral
Pachyseris speciosa (Dana, 1846) – Disc coral
Pavona clavus (Dana, 1846)
Pavona decussata (Dana, 1846) – Peacock coral
Pavona explanulata (Lamarck, 1816)
Pavona minuta Wells, 1954 – Leaf coral
Pavona venosa (Ehrenberg, 1834)

Family Caryophylliidae
Caryophyllia spp. – cup corals

Family Coscinaraeidae
Anomastraea irregularis von Marenzeller, 1901 – Irregular honeycomb coral
Coscinaraea columna (Dana, 1846) – 
Coscinaraea exesa (Dana, 1846)
Coscinaraea monile Forskål, 1775
Coscarinaea spp. – Brain corals
Horastrea indica Pichon, 1971

Family Dendrophylliidae
Balanophyllia (Balanophyllia) bonaespei van der Horst, 1938 – Cup coral
Dendrophyllia robusta (Bourne, 1905) – Turret coral
Tubastraea micranthus (Ehrenberg, 1834) – Green tree coral
Turbinaria irregularis Bernard, 1896
Turbinaria mesenterina (Lamarck, 1816) – Turbinate coral

Family Euphylliidae
Galaxea fascicularis (Linnaeus, 1767) – Spiky coral
Galaxea astreata (Lamarck, 1816) – Spiky coral
Gyrosmilia interrupta (Ehrenberg, 1834) – Brain corals

Family Fungiidae
Cycloseris costulata (Ortmann, 1889)
Cycloseris cyclolites (Lamarck, 1815)
Cycloseris distorta (Michelin, 1842)
Cycloseris spp. Mushroom corals
Halomitra pileus (Linnaeus, 1758) – Helmet coral
Herpolitha limax (Esper, 1797)
Herpolitha spp. – Mushroom corals
Lobactis scutaria (Lamarck, 1801) – Mushroom coral syn. Fungia scutaria Lamarck, 1801
Podabacia crustacea (Pallas, 1766)

Family Lobophylliidae
Acanthastrea brevis Milne Edwards & Haime, 1849
Acanthastrea echinata (Dana, 1846) – Spiny honeycomb coral
Acanthastrea hemprichi (Ehrenberg, 1834)
Acanthastrea ishigakiensis Veron, 1990
Acanthastrea simplex (Crossland, 1848) (nomen dubium on WoRMS)
Acanthastrea subechinata Veron, 2000
Echinophyllia aspera (Ellis & Solander, 1786)
Lobophyllia spp. – False brain corals
Parascolymia vitiensis (Brüggemann, 1877)
Symphyllia valenciennesii Milne Edwards & Haime – Brain corals

Family Merulinidae
Astrea annuligera Milne Edwards & Haime, 1849 – false knob coral
Astrea devantieri (Veron, 2000)
Cyphastrea chalcidicum (Forskål, 1775)
Cyphastrea serailia (Forskål, 1775)
Dipsastraea danai (Milne Edwards, 1857)
Dipsastraea favus (Forskål, 1775) – Knob coral
Dipsastraea laxa (Klunzinger, 1879) – Knob coral
Dipsastraea matthaii (Vaughan, 1918) – Knob coral
Dipsastraea pallida (Dana, 1846) – Knob coral
Dipsastraea rotumana (Gardiner, 1899) – Knob coral
Dipsastraea speciosa (Dana, 1846) – Knob coral 
Dipsastraea vietnamensis (Veron, 2000)
Echinopora forskaliana (Milne Edwards & Haime, 1849)
Echinopora gemmacea (Lamarck, 1816)
Echinopora hirsutissima Milne Edwards & Haime, 1849 – Prickly pored coral
Favites abdita (Ellis & Solander, 1786) – larger star coral
Favites acuticollis (Ortmann, 1889)
Favites chinensis (Verrill, 1866)
Favites complanata (Ehrenberg, 1834) – larger star coral
Favites flexuosa Dana, 1846 – larger star coral
Favites halicora (Ehrenberg, 1834) – larger star coral
Favites pentagona (Esper, 1795) – larger star coral
Favites russelli (Wells, 1954)
Favites spinosa (Klunzinger, 1879)
Favites vasta (Klunzinger, 1879)
Favites spp. – Honeycomb corals
Goniastrea edwardsi Chevalier, 1971
Goniastrea pectinata (Ehrenberg, 1834)
Goniastrea retiformis (Lamarck, 1816)
Goniastrea stelligera (Dana, 1846) Favia stelligera (Dana, 1846)
Goniastrea spp. – Honeycomb corals
Hydnophora exesa (Pallas, 1766)
Hydnophora microconos (Lamarck, 1816) – Small-coned coral
Hydnophora pilosa Veron, 1985
Leptoria phrygia (Ellis & Solander, 1786) – Least valley coral
Oulophyllia crispa (Lamarck, 1816) – Brain coral
Paramontastraea peresi (Faure & Pichon, 1978) – larger star coral
Pectinia africana Veron, 2000
Platygyra daedalea (Ellis & Solander, 1786) – Labyrinthine brain coral
Platygyra sinensis (Milne Edwards & Haime, 1849)

Family Mussidae, subfamily Faviinae
Favia spp. – False honeycomb corals

Family Plesiastreidae
Plesiastrea versipora (Lamarck, 1816) – Star-like coral

Family Pocilloporidae
Pocillopora damicornis (Linnaeus, 1758) – Knob-horned coral
Pocillopora grandis Dana, 1846
Pocillopora verrucosa (Ellis & Solander, 1786) – Knob-horned coral
Seriatopora caliendrum Ehrenberg, 1834
Stylophora pistillata Esper, 1797 – Tramp coral

Family Poritidae
Goniopora djiboutiensis Vaughan, 1907 – Daisy coral
Goniopora planulata (Ehrenberg, 1834)
Goniopora somaliensis Vaughan, 1907 – anemone coral
Porites lichen Dana, 1846
Porites lutea Quoy & Gaimard, 1833
Porites solida (Forskål, 1775)
Porites spp. – Porous corals

Family Psammocoridae
Psammocora haimiana Milne Edwards & Haime, 1851

Scleractinia incertae sedis
Blastomussa merleti (Wells, 1961)

Scleractinia incertae sedis
Leptastrea purpurea (Dana, 1846) – Crust coral

Order Zoantharia, suborder Brachycnemina

Family Sphenopidae
Palythoa natalensis Carlgren, 1938 – Squat sandy zoanthid
Palythoa nelliae Pax, 1935 – Columnar sandy zoanthid
Palythoa tuberculosa (Esper, 1791) – Leathery zoanthid

Family Zoanthidae
Isaurus tuberculatus Gray, 1828 – Knobbly zoanthid
Zoanthus durbanensis Carlgren – Durban zoanthid
Zoanthus eyrei ? 2O
Zoanthus natalensis Carlgen – Green zoanthid
Zoanthus parvus ? – Not in WoRMS
Zoanthus sansibaricus Carlgren, 1900 – Violet zoanthid check date

Suborder Macrocnemina

Family Parazoanthidae
Isozoanthus capensis Carlgren, 1938 – Cape zoanthid
Parazoanthus sp. – Sponge zoanthid

Subclass Octocorallia

Order Alcyonacea, suborder Alcyoniina

Family Alcyoniidae
Acrophytum claviger Hickson, 1900
Alcyonium distinctum Williams, 1988
Alcyonium elegans (Kükenthal, 1902)
Alcyonium fauri Studer, 1910 – Purple soft coral
Alcyonium foliatum J. S. Thomson, 1921
Alcyonium reptans Kükenthal, 1906
Alcyonium roseum (Tixier-Durivault, 1954)
Alcyonium wilsoni (J.S. Thomson, 1921)
Aldersladum sodwanum  (Benayahu, 1993)
Anthomastus giganteus Tixier-Durivault, 1954
Anthomastus hicksoni Bock, 1938
Cladiella australis (Macfadyen, 1936)
Cladiella kashmani Benayahu & Schleyer, 1996 – Blanching soft coral
Cladiella krempfi  (Hickson, 1919)
Cladiella madagascarensis (Tixier-Durivault, 1944)
Dimorphophyton mutabiliforme  (Williams, 1988)
Eleutherobia studeri  (J.S. Thomson, 1910)
Eleutherobia variabile (Thomson, 1921) – Variable soft coral
Eleutherobia vinadigitaria Williams & Little, 2001
Lampophyton planiceps (Williams, 1986)
Lobophytum crassum von Marenzeller, 1886 – Dimorphic soft coral
Lobophytum crebliplicatum von Marenzeller, 1886
Lobophytum depressum Tixier-Durivault, 1966
Lobophytum latilobatum Verseveldt, 1971
Lobophytum patulum Tixier-Durivault, 1956
Lobophytum venustum Tixier-durivault, 1957 – Dimorphic soft coral
Malacacanthus capensis (Hickson, 1900) – Sunburst soft coral
Minabea spp.
Sarcophyton ehrenbergi (v. Marenzeller, 1886)
Sarcophyton flexuosum Tixier-Durivault, 1966
Sarcophyton glaucum  (Quoy & Gaimard, 1833)
Sarcophyton infundibuliforme Tixier-Durivault, 1958
Sarcophyton trocheliophorum von Marenzeller, 1886
Sarcophyton spp. – Mushroom soft corals
Sinularia abrubta Tixier-Durivault, 1970 – Abrupt leather-coral
Sinularia brassica May, 1898 – Cabbage leather-coral
Sinularia erecta Tixier-Durivault, 1945
Sinularia firma Tixier-Durivault, 1970
Sinularia gardineri (Pratt, 1903)
Sinularia gravis Tixier-Durivault, 1970 – Lobed leather-coral
Sinularia gyrosa (Klunzinger, 1877)
Sinularia heterospiculata Verseveldt, 1970 – Spiky leather-coral
Sinularia hirta (Pratt, 1903)
Sinularia leptoclados (Ehrenberg, 1834) – Finger-branched leather-coral
Sinularia muralis (May, 1899)
Sinularia notanda Tixier-Durivault, 1966
Sinularia polydactyla (Eherenberg, 1834)(Madagascar, seychelles)
Sinularia querciformis (Pratt, 1903)
Sinularia schleyeri Benayahu, 1993
Sinularia triangula Tixier-Durivault, 1970
Sinularia variabilis Tixier-Durivault, 1945
Verseveldtia bucciniforme Williams, 1990
Verseveldtia trochiforme (Hickson, 1900)

Family Nephtheidae
Capnella susanae Williams, 1988
Capnella thyrsoidea (Verrill, 1865) – Cauliflower soft coral 
Dendronephthya inhacaensis Verseveldt, 1960 – Thistle soft corals
Dendronephthya mutabilis Tixier-Durivault & Prevor, 1962 – Thistle soft corals
Dendronephthya spp. – Thistle soft corals
Eunephthya celata McFadden & van Ofwegen, 2012
Eunephthya ericius McFadden & van Ofwegen, 2012
Eunephthya granulata McFadden & van Ofwegen, 2012
Eunephthya shirleyae McFadden & van Ofwegen, 2012
Eunephthya thyrsoidea Verrill, 1869
Litophyton liltvedi Verseveldt & Williams, 1988
Nephthea sp.
Scleronephthya spp.
Stereonephthya spp.

Family Nidaliidae
Pieterfaurea equicalceola Williams, 2000
Pieterfaurea khoisaniana (Williams, 1988)
Pieterfaurea lampas Williams, 2000
Pieterfaurea sinuosa Williams, 2000
Pieterfaurea unilobata (J.S. Thomson, 1921)
Siphonogorgia sp.

Family Parasphaerascleridae
Parasphaerasclera aurea (Benayahu & Schleyer, 1995) – Golden soft coral
Parasphaerasclera morifera (Tixier-Durivault, 1954)
Parasphaerasclera rotifera (Thomson, 1910)
Parasphaerasclera valdiviae (Kukenthal, 1906) – Valdivian soft coral

Family Xeniidae
Anthelia glauca Lamarck, 1816
Cespitularia coerula May, 1898
Heteroxenia elisabethae Kölliker, 1874
Heteroxenia fuscescens (Ehrenberg, 1834) – Pulsating soft coral
Heteroxenia membranacea Schenk, 1896
Heteroxenia rigida  (May, 1899)
Sansibia flava (May, 1899) – Blue soft coral
Sympodium caeruleum Ehrenberg, 1834
Xenia crassa Schenk, 1896 – Stalked soft coral
Xenia dayi Tixier-Durivault, 1959
Xenia florida (Lesson, 1826)
Xenia kukenthali Roxas, 1933
Xenia umbellata Lamarck, 1816
Xenia viridis Schenk, 1896

Order Calcaxonia

Family Chrysogorgiidae
Chrysogorgia sp.
Helicogorgia capensis (Simpson, 1910)
Helicogorgia flagellata (Simpson, 1910)
Helicogorgia spiralis (Hickson, 1904)
Helicogorgia squamifera (Kükenthal, 1919)
Radicipes sp.
Xenogorgia sciurus Bayer & Muzik, 1976

Family Ellisellidae
Junceella spp.

Family Isididae
Acanella sp.
Chathamisis ramosa (Hickson, 1904)
Keratoisis sp.

Family Primnoidae
Callogorgia sp.
Calyptrophora sp.
Narella gilchristi (Thomson, 1911)
Primnoella sp.
Primnoeides sp.
Thouarella (Thouarella) hicksoni Thomson, J.S., 1911

Subrder Holaxonia

Family Acanthogorgiidae
Acanthogorgia spp.
Anthogorgia sp.

Family Gorgoniidae
Eunicella albicans (Kölliker, 1865) – Flagellar sea fan
Eunicella papillosa (Esper, 1797) – Nippled sea fan
Eunicella tricoronata Velimirov, 1971 – Sinuous sea fan
Leptogorgia barnardi Stiasny, 1940
Leptogorgia capensis (Hickson, 1900)
Leptogorgia gilchristi (Hickson, 1904)
Leptogorgia abietina Kükenthal, 1919
Leptogorgia lütkeni (Wright & Studer, 1889)
Leptogorgia palma (Pallas, 1766) – Palmate sea fan
Leptogorgia pusilla Kükenthal, 1919
Leptogorgia rigida Verrill, 1864
Leptogorgia tenuissima Kükenthal, 1919

Family Keroeididae
Ideogorgia capensis (Simpson, 1910)

Family Plexauridae
Acanthomuricea pulchra (J.S. Thomson, 1911)
Astromuricea fusca (J.S. Thomson, 1911)
Echinomuricea spp.
Euplexaura spp.
Menella sp.
Rumphella aggregata (Nutting, 1910) – Bushy whip corals
Rumphella sp. Ropy sea fan
Trichogorgia capensis (Hickson, 1904)
Trichogorgia flexilis Hickson, 1904

Suborder Scleraxonia

Family Anthothelidae
Anthothela parviflora Thomson, 1917
Diodogorgia capensis (Thomson, 1911)
Homophyton verrucosum (Möbius, 1861) – Warty sea fan, Gorgonian twig coral

Subfamily Melithaeinae
Melithaea capensis (Studer, 1878)
Melithaea coccinea (Ellis & Solander, 1786)
Melithaea furcata (Thomson, 1916)
Melithaea rubra (Esper, 1789) – Multicolour sea fan
Melithaea singularis (Thomson, 1916)
Melithaea trilineata (Thomson, 1917)
Melithaea valdiviae (Kükenthal, 1908)
Melithaea wrighti Reijnen, McFadden, Hermanlimianto & van Ofwegen, 2014

Suborder Stolonifera

Family Clavulariidae
Bathytelesto tubuliporoides Williams, 1989
Clavularia cylindrica Wright & Studer, 1889
Clavularia diademata Broch, 1939
Clavularia elongata Wright & Studer, 1889 (dubious)
Clavularia parva Tixier-Durivault, 1964
Clavularia sp.
Scyphopodium ingolfi (Madsen, 1944)
Sarcodictyon sp.
Scleranthelia thomsoni Williams, 1987
Telesto arborea Wright & Studer, 1889 – Cave-dwelling soft coral
Telestula sp.

Family Tubiporidae
Tubipora musica Linnaeus, 1758 – Organ-pipe coral

Order Pennatulacea

Family Chunellidae
Amphiacme abyssorum (Kükenthal, 1902)
Chunella gracillima Kükenthal, 1902

Family Echinoptilidae
Actinoptilum molle (Kükenthal, 1902) – Purple sea pen, Cylindrical sea pen
Echinoptilum echinatum (Kükenthal, 1910)
Echinoptilum macintoshii Hubrecht, 1885

Family Scleroptilidae
Calibelemnon sp.
Scleroptilum sp.

Suborder Sessiliflorae

Family Anthoptilidae
Anthoptilum grandiflorum (Verrill, 1879)

Family Funiculinidae
Funiculina quadrangularis (Pallas, 1766)

Family Kophobelemnidae
Kophobelemnon stelliferum (Müller, 1776)
Kophobelemnon sp.

Family Protoptilidae
Distichoptilum gracile Verrill, 1882

Family Umbellulidae
Umbellula lindahli Kölliker, 1875
Umbellula thomsoni Kölliker, 1874

Family Veretillidae
Cavernulina sp.
Cavernularia dayi Tixier-Durivault, 1954
Cavernularia elegans (Herklots, 1858)
Lituaria valenciennesi d'Hondt, 1984
Veretillum cynomorum (Pallas, 1766)
Veretillum leloupi Tixier-Durivault, 1960

suborder Subsessiliflorae

Family Halipteridae
Halipteris africana (Studer, 1878)
Halipteris spp.

Family Pennatulidae
Pennatula inflata Kükenthal, 1910
Pteroeides isosceles J.S. Thomson, 1915 – Rotund sea pen
Pteroeides spp.

Family Virgulariidae
Scytaliopsis djiboutiensis Gravier, 1906
Virgularia gustaviana (Herklots, 1863) – Elegant sea pen
Virgularia mirabilis (Müller, 1776)
Virgularia schultzei Kükenthal, 1910 – Feathery sea pen

Class Cubozoa

Order Carybdeida

Family Carybdeidae
Carybdea branchi Gershwin & Gibbons, 2009 – Box jellyfish

Family Tamoyidae
Tamoya haplonema F. Müller, 1859

Order Chirodropida

Family Chirodropidae
Chirodropus gorilla Haeckel, 1880
Chirodropus palmatus Haeckel, 1880

Family Chiropsalmidae
Chiropsalmus sp.

Class Hydrozoa, subclass Hydroidolina

Order Anthoathecata, suborder Aplanulata

Family Candelabridae
Candelabrum capensis (Manton, 1940)
Candelabrum tentaculatum (Millard, 1966)
Monocoryne minor Millard, 1966 – Agulhas bank

Family Corymorphidae
Branchiocerianthus imperator (Allman, 1888)
Corymorpha abaxialis (Kramp, 1962)
Corymorpha bigelowi (Maas, 1905)
Corymorpha forbesii (Mayer, 1894)
Corymorpha furcata (Kramp, 1948)
Corymorpha gracilis (Brooks, 1883)
Euphysa aurata Forbes, 1848
Euphysa brevia (Uchida, 1947)
Euphysa tetrabrachia Bigelow, 1904
Euphysilla pyramidata Kramp, 1955
Paragotoea bathybia Kramp, 1942

Family Tubulariidae
Ectopleura betheris (Warren, 1908)
Ectopleura crocea (Agassiz, 1862)
Ectopleura dumortieri (Van Beneden, 1844)
Ectopleura larynx (Ellis & Solander, 1786)
Hybocodon unicus (Browne, 1902)
Zyzzyzus warreni Calder, 1988

Suborder Capitata

Family Asyncorynidae
Asyncoryne ryniensis Warren, 1908

Family Cladocorynidae
Cladocoryne floccosa Rotch, 1871

Family Family Cladonematidae
Staurocladia vallentini (Browne, 1902)

Family Corynidae
Bicorona elegans Millard, 1966
Codonium proliferum (Forbes, 1848)
Coryne eximia Allman, 1859
Coryne gracilis (Browne, 1902)
Coryne inabai Not found anywhere
Coryne nutans Allman, 1872 – (taxon inquirendum)
Coryne producta Cannot identify this one
Coryne pusilla Gaertner, 1774
Slabberia halterata Forbes, 1846
Stauridiosarsia baukalion (Pagès, Gili & Bouillon, 1992)syn. Dipurena baukalion
Stauridiosarsia ophiogaster (Haeckel, 1879)syn. Dipurena ophiogaster
Sarsia tubulosa (M. Sars, 1835)

Family Halimedusidae
Urashimea globosa Kishinouye, 1910

Family Milleporidae
Millepora tenella Esper, 1795 – Fire coral? – taxon inquirendum
Millepora tenera Boschma, 1949 – Fire coral?
Millepora platyphylla Hemprich & Ehrenberg, 1834

Family Moerisiidae
Moerisia inkermanica Paltschikowa-Osroumowa, 1925

Family Pennariidae
Pennaria disticha Goldfuss, 1820
Pennaria pauper Kramp, 1959 – taxon inquirendum

Family Porpitidae
Porpita porpita (Linnaeus, 1758) – Porpita pacifica
Velella velella (Linnaeus, 1758)

Family Solanderiidae
Solanderia fusca (Gray, 1868)
Solanderia procumbens (Carter, 1873)
Solanderia secunda (Inaba, 1892)

Family Sphaerocorynidae
Sphaerocoryne bedoti Pictet, 1893 – Natal and Mozambique, India, Madagascar, Queensland and Japan

Family Teissieridae
Teissiera medusifera Bouillon, 1978

Family Zancleidae
Zanclea sp.

Family Zancleopsidae
Zancleopsis gotoi (Uchida, 1927)
Zancleopsis spp.

Capitata incertae sedis
Rhabdoon singulare Keferstein & Ehlers, 1861

Capitata incertae sedis
Plotocnide incertae (Linko, 1900) – taxon inquirendum

Capitata incertae sedis
Cnidocodon leopoldi Bouillon, 1978

Suborder Filifera

Family Bougainvilliidae
Bimeria fluminalis Annandale, 1915
Bimeria rigida Warren, 1919
Bimeria vestita Wright, 1859
Bougainvillia fulva Agassiz & Mayer, 1899
Bougainvillia macloviana Lesson, 1830
Bougainvillia meinertiae Jäderholm, 1923
Bougainvillia muscoides (Sars, 1846)
Bougainvillia muscus (Allman, 1863)
Bougainvillia platygaster (Haeckel, 1879)
Dicoryne conferta (Alder, 1856)
Garveia crassa (Stechow, 1923)
Koellikerina fasciculata (Péron & Lesueur, 1810)
Koellikerina multicirrata (Kramp, 1928)
Nemopsis bachei L. Agassiz, 1849
Nubiella mitra Bouillon, 1980
Pachycordyle navis (Millard, 1959)
Parawrightia robusta Warren, 1907

Family Bythotiaridae
Bythotiara capensis Pagès, Bouillon & Gili, 1991
Bythotiara murrayi Günther, 1903
Calycopsis bigelowi Vanhöffen, 1911
Calycopsis borchgrevinki (Browne, 1910)
Calycopsis chuni Vanhöffen, 1911
Calycopsis typa Fewkes, 1882
Heterotiara minor Vanhöffen, 1911 
Protiaropsis anonyma (Maas, 1905)
Pseudotiara tropica (Bigelow, 1912)
Sibogita geometrica Maas, 1905

Family Cytaeididae
Cytaeis nassa (Millard, 1959)

Family Eudendriidae
Eudendrium angustum Warren, 1908
Eudendrium antarcticum Stechow, 1921
Eudendrium capillare Alder, 1856
Eudendrium carneum Clarke, 1882
Eudendrium deciduum Millard, 1957
Eudendrium ramosum (Linnaeus, 1758)
Eudendrium ritchiei Millard, 1975
Eudendrium simplex Pieper, 1884

Family Hydractiniidae
Clava sp.
Hydractinia altispina Millard, 1955
Hydractinia apicata (Kramp, 1959)
Hydractinia canalifera Millard, 1957
Hydractinia carica Bergh, 1887
Hydractinia diogenes Millard, 1959
Hydractinia kaffraria Millard, 1955
Hydractinia marsupialia Millard, 1975
Hydractinia multitentaculata (Millard, 1975)
Podocoryna carnea M. Sars, 1846

Family Hydrichthyidae
Hydrichthys boycei Warren, 1916
Hydrocorella africana Stechow, 1921

Family Magapiidae
Fabienna oligonema (Kramp, 1955)
Kantiella enigmatica Bouillon, 1978

Family Oceaniidae
Corydendrium parasiticum (Linnaeus, 1767)
Merona cornucopiae (Norman, 1864)
Rhizogeton nudus Broch, 1910
Turritopsis nutricula McCrady, 1857

Family Pandeidae
Amphinema australis (Mayer, 1900)
Amphinema dinema (Péron & Lesueur, 1810)
Amphinema rugosum (Mayer, 1900)
Amphinema turrida (Mayer, 1900)
Annatiara affinis (Hartlaub, 1914)
Halitholus intermedius (Browne, 1902)
Halitholus pauper Hartlaub, 1914
Leuckartiara adnata Pagès, Gili & Bouillon, 1992
Leuckartiara annexa Kramp, 1957
Leuckartiara gardineri Browne, 1916
Leuckartiara octona (Fleming, 1823)
Neoturris papua (Lesson, 1843)
Neoturris pileata (Forsskål, 1775)
Octotiara russelli Kramp, 1953
Pandea conica (Quoy & Gaimard, 1827)
Pandeopsis ikarii (Uchida, 1927)

Family Proboscidactylidae
Proboscidactyla halterata 
Proboscidactyla menoni Pagès, Bouillon & Gili, 1991
Proboscidactyla mutabilis (Browne, 1902)
Proboscidactyla ornata (McCrady, 1859)
Proboscidactyla stellata (Forbes, 1846)

Family Rathkeidae
Lizzia blondina Forbes, 1848

Family Stylasteridae
Stylaster nobilis (Saville-Kent, 1871) – Noble coral

Order Leptothecata

Family Aequoreidae

Aequorea africana Millard, 1966
Aequorea australis Uchida, 1947
Aequorea coerulescens (Brandt, 1835)
Aequorea conica Browne, 1905
Aequorea forskalea Péron & Lesueur, 1810 – Crystal jellyfish
Aequorea macrodactyla (Brandt, 1835)
Aequorea pensilis (Haeckel, 1879)
Zygocanna buitendijki Stiasny, 1928
Zygocanna vagans Bigelow, 1912

Family Blackfordiidae

Blackfordia virginica Mayer, 1910

Family Campanulinidae

Calycella oligista Ritchie, 1910

Family Campanulariidae

Campanularia africana Stechow, 1923
Campanularia hincksii Alder, 1856
Campanularia laminacarpa Millard, 1966
Campanularia morgansi Millard, 1957
Campanularia pecten Gow & Millard, 1975
Campanularia roberti Gow & Millard, 1975
Clytia brunescens (Bigelow, 1904)
Clytia globosa (Mayer, 1900)
Clytia hemisphaerica (Linnaeus, 1767)
Clytia hummelincki (Leloup, 1935)
Clytia latitheca Millard & Bouillon, 1973
Clytia linearis (Thorneley, 1900)
Clytia macrogonia Bouillon, 1984
Clytia paradoxa (Stechow, 1923)
Clytia paulensis (Vanhöffen, 1910)
Clytia phosphorica (Péron & Lesueur, 1810) – taxon inquirendum
Clytia simplex (Browne, 1902)
Clytia warreni Stechow, 1919
Gonothyraea loveni (Allman, 1859)
Laomedea calceolifera (Hincks, 1871)
Obelia bidentata Clark, 1875
Obelia dichotoma (Linnaeus, 1758)
Obelia geniculata (Linnaeus, 1758)
Orthopyxis everta (Clark, 1876)	
Orthopyxis integra (MacGillivray, 1842)

Family Eirenidae

Eirene ceylonensis Browne, 1905
Eirene hexanemalis (Goette, 1886)
Eirene menoni Kramp, 1953
Eirene palkensis Browne, 1905
Eirene viridula (Péron & Lesueur, 1809)
Eutima curva Browne, 1905
Eutima gegenbauri (Haeckel, 1864)
Eutima hartlaubi Kramp, 1958
Eutima japonica Uchida, 1925
Eutima levuka (Agassiz & Mayer, 1899)
Eutima mira McCrady, 1859
Phialopsis diegensis Torrey, 1909
Tima bairdii (Johnston, 1833)

Family Hebellidae
Hebella dispolians (Warren, 1909)
Hebella furax Millard, 1957
Hebella parvula(Hincks, 1853) – (nomen dubium)
Hebella scandens (Bale, 1888)
Scandia mutabilis (Ritchie, 1907)

Family Laodiceidae
Laodicea fijiana Agassiz & Mayer, 1899
Laodicea pulchra Browne, 1902
Laodicea undulata (Forbes & Goodsir, 1853)
Staurodiscus polynema (Kramp, 1959)

Family Lineolariidae
Nicoliana gravierae (Millard, 1975)

Family Lovenellidae
Cirrholovenia polynema Kramp, 1959
Cirrholovenia tetranema Kramp, 1959
Eucheilota paradoxica Mayer, 1900
Mitrocomium cirratum Haeckel, 1879

Family Malagazziidae
Malagazzia carolinae (Mayer, 1900)
Malagazzia condensum (Kramp, 1953)

Family Mitrocomidae
Cosmetirella davisi (Browne, 1902)
Mitrocomella grandis Kramp, 1965
Mitrocomella millardae Pagès, Gili & Bouillon, 1992

Family Phialellidae
Phialella chiquitita (Millard, 1959)
Phialella falklandica Browne, 1902						
Phialella quadrata (Forbes, 1848) 						
Phialella turrita (Hincks, 1868)

Family Sertulariidae
Abietinaria laevimarginata (Ritchie, 1907)
Amphisbetia maplestonei (Bale, 1884)
Amphisbetia minima (Thompson, 1879)
Amphisbetia operculata (Linnaeus, 1758)
Calamphora campanulata (Warren, 1908)
Crateritheca acanthostoma (Bale, 1882)
Dictyocladium coactum Stechow, 1923
Diphasia digitalis (Busk, 1852)
Diphasia heurteli Billard, 1924
Diphasia tetraglochina Billard, 1907
Dynamena crisioides Lamouroux, 1824
Dynamena disticha (Bosc, 1802)
Dynamena obliqua Lamouroux, 1816
Dynamena quadridentata (Ellis & Solander, 1786)
Idiellana pristis (Lamouroux, 1816)
Salacia desmoides (Torrey, 1902)
Salacia disjuncta Millard, 1964
Sertularella africana Stechow, 1919
Sertularella agulhensis Millard, 1964
Sertularella arbuscula (Lamouroux, 1816)
Sertularella areyi Nutting, 1904
Sertularella capensis Millard, 1957
Sertularella congregata Millard, 1964
Sertularella diaphana (Allman, 1885)
Sertularella distans (Lamouroux, 1816)
Sertularella dubia Billard, 1907
Sertularella flabellum (Allman, 1885)
Sertularella fusiformis (Hincks, 1861)
Sertularella gilchristi Millard, 1964
Sertularella goliathus Stechow, 1923
Sertularella leiocarpa (Allman, 1888)
Sertularella marginata Not found in WoRMS Could it be Sertularia marginata (Kirchenpauer, 1864)
Sertularella mediterranea Hartlaub, 1901
Sertularella megista Stechow, 1923
Sertularella natalensis Millard, 1968
Sertularella polyzonias (Linnaeus, 1758)
Sertularella pulchra Stechow, 1923
Sertularella striata Stechow, 1923
Sertularella xantha Stechow, 1923
Sertularia loculosa Busk, 1852
Sertularia marginata (Kirchenpauer, 1864)
Sertularia turbinata (Lamouroux, 1816)
Staurotheca echinocarpa (Allman, 1888)
Stereotheca elongata (Lamouroux, 1816)
Symplectoscyphus amphoriferus (Allman, 1877)
Symplectoscyphus arboriformis (Marktanner-Turneretscher, 1890)
Symplectoscyphus macrogonus (Trebilcock, 1928)
Symplectoscyphus paulensis Stechow, 1923
Symplectoscyphus secundus (Kirchenpauer, 1884)
Thuiaria articulata (Pallas, 1766)
Thyroscyphus aequalis Warren, 1908
Thyroscyphus fruticosus (Esper, 1793)

Family Syntheciidae
Hincksella corrugata Millard, 1958
Hincksella cylindrica (Bale, 1888)
Synthecium dentigerum Jarvis, 1922
Synthecium elegans Allman, 1872
Synthecium hians Millard, 1957

Family Thyroscyphidae
Parascyphus simplex (Lamouroux, 1816)

Family Tiarannidae
Chromatonema rubrum Fewkes, 1882
Margalefia intermedia Pagès, Bouillon & Gili, 1991
Modeeria rotunda (Quoy & Gaimard, 1827)
Stegolaria geniculata (Allman, 1888)

Family Tiaropsidae
Tiaropsidium roseum (Maas, 1905)

Superfamily Plumularioidea, family Aglaopheniidae
Aglaophenia cupressina Lamouroux, 1816
Aglaophenia latecarinata Allman, 1877
Aglaophenia pluma (Linnaeus, 1758)
Cladocarpus crepidatus Millard, 1975
Cladocarpus distomus Clarke, 1907
Cladocarpus dofleini (Stechow, 1911)
Cladocarpus inflatus Vervoort, 1966
Cladocarpus leloupi Millard, 1962
Cladocarpus lignosus (Kirchenpauer, 1872)
Cladocarpus millardae  Vervoort, 1966
Cladocarpus natalensis Millard, 1977
Cladocarpus paries Millard, 1975
Cladocarpus sinuosus Vervoort, 1966
Cladocarpus tenuis Clarke, 1879
Cladocarpus unicornus Millard, 1975
Cladocarpus valdiviae Stechow, 1923
Gymnangium africanum (Millard, 1958)
Gymnangium allmani (Marktanner-Turneretscher, 1890)
Gymnangium arcuatum (Lamouroux, 1816)
Gymnangium exsertum (Millard, 1962)
Gymnangium ferlusi (Billard, 1901)
Gymnangium gracilicaule (Jäderholm, 1903)
Gymnangium hians (Busk, 1852)
Gymnangium longirostre (Kirchenpauer, 1872)
Gymnangium montagui (Billard, 1912)
Lytocarpia brevirostris (Busk, 1852)
Lytocarpia delicatula (Busk, 1852)
Lytocarpia flexuosa (Lamouroux, 1816)
Lytocarpia formosa (Busk, 1851)
Macrorhynchia filamentosa (Lamarck, 1816)
Macrorhynchia philippina Kirchenpauer, 1872
Macrorhynchia phoenicea (Busk, 1852)

Family Haleciidae
Halecium beanii (Johnston, 1838)
Halecium delicatulum Coughtrey, 1876
Halecium dichotomum Allman, 1888
Halecium dyssymetrum Billard, 1929
Halecium halecinum (Linnaeus, 1758)
Halecium inhacae Millard, 1958
Halecium lankesterii (Bourne, 1890)
Halecium muricatum (Ellis & Solander, 1786)
Halecium sessile Norman, 1866
Halecium tenellum Hincks, 1861
Hydrodendron cornucopiae (Millard, 1955)
Hydrodendron gardineri (Jarvis, 1922)
Hydrodendron gracillis (Fraser, 1914)
Hydrodendron mirabile (Hincks, 1866)
Hydrodendron sympodiformis Millard & Bouillon, 1974

Family Halopterididae
Antennella quadriaurita Ritchie, 1909
Antennella secundaria (Gmelin, 1791)
Corhiza bellicosa Millard, 1962
Corhiza complexa (Nutting, 1905)
Corhiza pannosa Millard, 1962
Corhiza scotiae (Ritchie, 1907)
Gattya conspecta (Billard, 1907)
Gattya heurteli (Billard, 1907)
Gattya humilis Allman, 1885
Gattya multithecata (Jarvis, 1922)
Halopteris gemellipara Millard, 1962
Halopteris glutinosa (Lamouroux, 1816)
Halopteris polymorpha (Billard, 1913)
Halopteris pseudoconstricta Millard, 1975
Halopteris rostrata Millard, 1975
Halopteris tuba (Kirchenpauer, 1876)
Monostaechas faurei Millard, 1958
Monostaechas natalensis Millard, 1958
Monostaechas quadridens (McCrady, 1859)
Schizotricha frutescens (Ellis & Solander, 1786)

Family Kirchenpaueriidae
Kirchenpaueria bonnevieae (Billard, 1906)
Kirchenpaueria halecioides (Alder, 1859)
Kirchenpaueria pinnata (Linnaeus, 1758)
Kirchenpaueria triangulata (Totton, 1930)
Oswaldella nova (Jarvis, 1922)
Pycnotheca mirabilis (Allman, 1883)

Family Lafoeidae
Acryptolaria conferta (Allman, 1877)
Acryptolaria crassicaulis (Allman, 1888)
Acryptolaria rectangularis (Jarvis, 1922)
Cryptolarella abyssicola (Allman, 1888)
Cryptolaria pectinata (Allman, 1888)
Filellum antarcticum (Hartlaub, 1904)
Filellum serpens (Hassall, 1848)
Filellum serratum (Clarke, 1879)
Lafoea benthophila Ritchie, 1909
Lafoea dumosa (Fleming, 1820)
Zygophylax africana Stechow, 1923
Zygophylax antipathes (Lamarck, 1816)
Zygophylax armata (Ritchie, 1907)
Zygophylax biarmata Billard, 1905
Zygophylax geminocarpa Millard, 1958
Zygophylax geniculata (Clarke, 1894)
Zygophylax infundibulum Millard, 1958
Zygophylax sibogae Billard, 1918

Family Plumulariidae
Dentitheca bidentata (Jäderholm, 1905)
Nemertesia antennina (Linnaeus, 1758)
Nemertesia ciliata Bale, 1914
Nemertesia cymodocea (Busk, 1851)
Nemertesia ramosa (Lamarck, 1816)
Plumularia antonbruuni Millard, 1967
Plumularia filicaulis Kirchenpauer, 1876
Plumularia floridana Nutting, 1900 1973 		
Plumularia lagenifera Allman, 1885
Plumularia mossambicae Millard, 1975
Plumularia obliqua (Johnston, 1847)
Plumularia pulchella Bale, 1882
Plumularia setacea (Linnaeus, 1758)
Plumularia spinulosa Bale, 1882
Plumularia strictocarpa Pictet, 1893
Plumularia warreni Stechow, 1919
Plumularia wasini Jarvis, 1922

Order Siphonophorae, suborder Calycophorae

Family Abylidae, subfamily Abylinae
Abyla bicarinata Moser, 1925
Abyla haeckeli Lens & van Riemsdijk, 1908
Abyla trigona Quoy & Gaimard, 1827		
Ceratocymba dentata (Bigelow, 1918)
Ceratocymba leuckarti (Huxley, 1859)
Ceratocymba sagittata (Quoy & Gaimard, 1827)

Subfamily Abylopsinae
Abylopsis eschscholtzi (Huxley, 1859)
Abylopsis tetragona (Otto, 1823)
Bassia bassensis (Quoy & Gaimard, 1833)
Enneagonum hyalinum Quoy & Gaimard, 1827

Family Clausophyidae
Chuniphyes multidentata Lens & van Riemsdijk, 1908
Crystallophyes amygdalina Moser, 1925
Heteropyramis crystallina (Moser, 1925)
Heteropyramis maculata Moser, 1925
Kephyes ovata (Keferstein & Ehlers, 1860)

Family Diphyidae, subfamily Diphyinae
Chelophyes appendiculata (Eschscholtz, 1829)
Chelophyes contorta (Lens & van Riemsdijk, 1908)
Dimophyes arctica (Chun, 1897)
Diphyes bojani (Eschscholtz, 1825)
Diphyes chamissonis Huxley, 1859
Diphyes dispar Chamisso & Eysenhardt, 1821
Eudoxoides mitra (Huxley, 1859)
Eudoxoides spiralis (Bigelow, 1911)
Lensia achilles Totton, 1941
Lensia ajax Totton, 1941
Lensia campanella (Moser, 1917)
Lensia conoidea (Keferstein & Ehlers, 1860)
Lensia cossack Totton, 1941
Lensia exeter Totton, 1941
Lensia fowleri (Bigelow, 1911)
Lensia gnanamuthui Daniel & Daniel, 1963
Lensia grimaldii Leloup, 1933
Lensia hardy Totton, 1941
Lensia havock Totton, 1941
Lensia hostile Totton, 1941
Lensia hotspur Totton, 1941
Lensia hunter Totton, 1941
Lensia lelouveteau Totton, 1941
Lensia meteori (Leloup, 1934)
Lensia multicristata (Moser, 1925)
Lensia pannikari Daniel, 1971
Lensia subtilis (Chun, 1886)
Lensia subtiloides (Lens & van Riemsdijk, 1908)
Muggiaea atlantica Cunningham, 1892
Muggiaea kochi (Will, 1844)

Subfamily Sulculeolariinae
Sulculeolaria biloba (Sars, 1846)
Sulculeolaria chuni (Lens & van Riemsdijk, 1908)
Sulculeolaria monoica (Chun, 1888)
Sulculeolaria quadrivalvis de Blainville, 1830
Sulculeolaria turgida (Gegenbaur, 1854)

Family Hippopodiidae
Hippopodius hippopus (Forsskål, 1776)
Vogtia glabra Bigelow, 1918
Vogtia pentacantha Kölliker, 1853
Vogtia serrata (Moser, 1925)

Family Prayidae, subfamily Amphicaryoninae
Amphicaryon acaule Chun, 1888
Amphicaryon ernesti Totton, 1954
Amphicaryon peltifera (Haeckel, 1888)

Subfamily Nectopyramidinae
Nectadamas diomedeae (Bigelow, 1911)
Nectopyramis natans (Bigelow, 1911)
Nectopyramis thetis Bigelow, 1911

Subfamily Prayinae
Desmophyes annectens Haeckel, 1888
Praya dubia (Quoy & Gaimard, 1833)
Praya reticulata (Bigelow, 1911)
Rosacea cymbiformis (Delle Chiaje, 1830)
Rosacea plicata Bigelow, 1911

Family Sphaeronectidae
Sphaeronectes koellikeri Huxley, 1859

Suborder Cystonectae

Family Physaliidae
Physalia physalis (Linnaeus, 1758)

Family Rhizophysidae
Rhizophysa eysenhardti Gegenbaur, 1859
Rhizophysa filiformis (Forsskål, 1775)

Suborder Physonectae

Family Agalmatidae
Agalma elegans (Sars, 1846)
Agalma okenii Eschscholtz, 1825
Athorybia rosacea (Forsskål, 1775)
Cordagalma ordinata (Haeckel, 1888)
Halistemma rubrum (Vogt, 1852)
Marrus antarcticus Totton, 1954
Marrus orthocannoides Totton, 1954
Melophysa melo (Quoy & Gaimard, 1827)
Nanomia bijuga (Delle Chiaje, 1844)

Family Apolemiidae
Apolemia uvaria (Lesueur, 1815)

Family Forskaliidae
Forskalia contorta (Milne-Edwards, 1841)
Forskalia edwardsi Kölliker, 1853
Forskalia tholoides Haeckel, 1888 – (taxon inquirendum)

Family Physophoridae
Physophora hydrostatica Forsskål, 1775

Family Pyrostephidae
Bargmannia elongata Totton, 1954

Subclass Trachylinae

Order Limnomedusae

Family Olindiidae
Aglauropsis edwardsi Pagès, Bouillon & Gili, 1991
Aglauropsis edwardsii Pagès, Bouillon & Gili, 1991

Order Narcomedusae

Family Aeginidae
Aegina citrea Eschscholtz, 1829
Aeginura grimaldii Maas, 1904
Solmundella bitentaculata (Quoy & Gaimard, 1833)

Family Cuninidae
Cunina duplicata Maas, 1893
Cunina frugifera Kramp, 1948
Cunina globosa Eschscholtz, 1829
Cunina octonaria McCrady, 1857
Cunina peregrina Bigelow, 1909
Solmissus marshalli Agassiz & Mayer, 1902

Family Solmarisidae
Pegantha clara Bigelow, 1909
Pegantha laevis H. B. Bigelow, 1909
Pegantha martagon Haeckel, 1879
Pegantha rubiginosa (Kölliker, 1853)
Pegantha triloba Haeckel, 1879
Solmaris lenticula Haeckel, 1879

Order Trachymedusae

Family Geryoniidae
Geryonia proboscidalis (Forsskål, 1775)
Liriope tetraphylla (Chamisso & Eysenhardt, 1821)

Family Halicreatidae
Botrynema brucei Browne, 1908
Halicreas minimum Fewkes, 1882
Haliscera conica Vanhöffen, 1902
Halitrephes maasi Bigelow, 1909

Family Rhopalonematidae
Aglantha elata (Haeckel, 1879)
Aglaura hemistoma Péron & Lesueur, 1810
Amphogona apicata Kramp, 1957
Colobonema sericeum Vanhöffen, 1902
Crossota alba Bigelow, 1913
Crossota brunnea Vanhöffen, 1902
Pantachogon haeckeli Maas, 1893
Persa incolorata McCrady, 1857
Rhopalonema funerarium Vanhöffen, 1902
Rhopalonema velatum Gegenbaur, 1857
Sminthea eurygaster Gegenbaur, 1856
Tetrorchis erythrogaster Bigelow, 1909

Class Scyphozoa

Order Coronatae

Family Atollidae
Atolla russelli Repelin, 1962
Atolla wyvillei Haeckel, 1880

Family Nausithoidae
Nausithoe punctata Kölliker, 1853

Family Periphyllidae
Periphylla periphylla (Péron & Lesueur, 1810)

Order Carybdeida

Family Carybdeidae
Carybdea branchi Gershwin & Gibbons, 2009 – Box jellyfish

Order Rhizostomeae, suborder Kolpophorae

Family Cassiopeidae
Cassiopea andromeda (Forsskål, 1775)
Cassiopea depressa Haeckel, 1880

Family Cepheidae
Cephea coerulea Vanhöffen, 1902

Suborder Daktyliophorae

Familu Catostylidae
Catostylus mosaicus (Quoy & Gaimard,1824) – Blue blubber
Catostylus tagi (Haeckel, 1869)
Crambionella stuhlmanni (Chun, 1896)

Family Rhizostomatidae
Eupilema inexpectata Pages, Gili & Bouillon, 1992 – Root mouthed sea jelly
Rhizostoma luteum (Quoy & Gaimard, 1827)
Rhizostoma pulmo (Macri, 1778)

Order Semaeostomeae

Family Cyaneidae
Cyanea annasethe Haeckel, 1880 – Lion's mane (nomen dubium)
Cyanea capillata (Linnaeus, 1758) – Lion's mane
Drymonema dalmatinum Haeckel, 1880

Family Pelagiidae
Chrysaora fulgida (Reynaud, 1830)
Chrysaora hysoscella (Linnaeus, 1767) – Compass jelly; Red-banded jelly
Chrysaora quinquecirrha (Desor, 1848)
Pelagia noctiluca (Forsskål, 1775) – Night-light jelly

Family Ulmaridae
Aurelia aurita (Linnaeus, 1758) – Moon jellyfish
Discomedusa lobata Claus, 1877
Phacellophora camtschatica Brandt, 1835
Undosa undulata Haeckel, 1880

Class Staurozoa

Order Stauromedusae, suborder Cleistocarpida

Family Depastridae
Depastromorpha africana Carlgren, 1935 – Stalked trumpet jelly

Family Lipkeidae
Lipkea stephensoni Carlgren, 1933 – Bell stalked jelly

Notes

References

Marine biodiversity of South Africa
South Africa
South African animal biodiversity lists